Brendon Edmonds (born 28 November 1990) is a former New Zealand rugby union player who played as a prop for in the ITM Cup and the in Super Rugby.

Career

Hailing from the Hawke's Bay Region, Edmonds played during the 2006-2008 seasons for the Central Hawkes Bay College 1st XV along with the likes of Dominic Bird, Mua Sala & Andrew Burne. Edmonds then represented Hawkes Bay at Under 16, 18 and 20 level before making his senior breakthrough in 2011 where he came on in the ITM Cup Championship final in Palmerston North against Manawatu, helping his Magpies side win the title and get promoted to the 2012 ITM Cup Premiership. However it was the following year that Edmonds began making a name for himself with some strong displays in a good campaign for the Magpies.

He was not initially named in any Super Rugby squads for the 2014 season, but some injuries to front-row players at the Hurricanes saw him called up to their wider training squad.   He debuted on 18 April 2014 as a second-half substitute in a 39–20 victory for the Hurricanes over the in Wellington.

Edmonds signed for the for the 2015 Super Rugby season. He was described as a powerful scrummager with a high work rate who performed well in the successful 2015 Super Rugby season for the Highlanders as they won the Super Rugby championship.

His career was ended by a serious knee injury against the Western Force on April 1, 2016 which left him with nerve damage in his left knee.

References

1990 births
Living people
New Zealand rugby union players
Rugby union props
Hawke's Bay rugby union players
Hurricanes (rugby union) players
Highlanders (rugby union) players
Māori All Blacks players
People from Waipukurau
Rugby union players from the Hawke's Bay Region